Leonardo Iván Zarosa (born September 12, 1989) is an Argentine professional footballer who plays as a midfielder for Rivadavia de Venado Tuerto.

Born in Buenos Aires, Zarosa began playing football in the youth system of local club Independiente. He played professionally in Argentina, Chile, Paraguay, Uruguay and Venezuela.

Teams
 Rentistas 2004
 Miramar Misiones 2004–2005
 Tacuarembó 2006
 Durazno FC 2006
 Almirante Brown 2007–2008
 San Luis de Quillota 2009–2010
 Guaraní 2011
 Everton 2011
 Juventud Antoniana 2011–2012
 Trujillanos FC 2012–2013
 Aragua FC 2013
 Llaneros de Guanare 2013–2014
 Deportivo Petare 2014
 Rivadavia de Venado Tuerto 2014–

Honours
San Luis de Quillota
 Primera B: 2009

References

External links
 
 

1989 births
Living people
Argentine footballers
Footballers from Buenos Aires
Association football midfielders
Miramar Misiones players
Tacuarembó F.C. players
C.A. Rentistas players
Club Almirante Brown footballers
San Luis de Quillota footballers
Everton de Viña del Mar footballers
Club Guaraní players
Argentine expatriate footballers
Argentine expatriate sportspeople in Chile
Expatriate footballers in Chile
Argentine expatriate sportspeople in Paraguay
Expatriate footballers in Paraguay
Argentine expatriate sportspeople in Uruguay
Expatriate footballers in Uruguay